Michael Madden may refer to:

 Michael Madden (Medal of Honor) (1841–1920), U.S. Army soldier and Medal of Honor recipient
 Mickey Madden (born 1979), American musician with Maroon 5
 Mike Madden (born 1957), American former baseball player
 Mike Madden (politician) (born 1943), American politician
 Mick Madden (1882–1943), Australian rules